Torment of the Past (Italian:Tormento del passato) is a 1952 Italian melodrama film co-written and directed  by Mario Bonnard.

Cast
Hélène Rémy as  Luisa
Marc Lawrence as  Andrea Rossi
Raffaella Carrà as  Graziella (credited as Raffaella Pelloni)
Carlo Romano as  Marco Ferretti
Carla Del Poggio as Giulia/Florette
Luigi Pavese as  Bianchi
Laura Gore as  Florette's Maid
Guglielmo Inglese as  Giacomo
Giulio Battiferri as  Peppino
Renzo Borelli as Accomplice of Bianchi
Riccardo Garrone as Accomplice of Bianchi
Paul Le Pere as  Giovanni
Natale Cirino as  Padrone del barcone
Rino Salviati as  The Singer

References

External links

 

1952 films
1950s Italian-language films
Films directed by Mario Bonnard
Melodrama films
Italian drama films
1952 drama films
Italian black-and-white films
1950s Italian films